Per Olav Baarnaas (4 November 1919 – 20 November 2004) was a Norwegian race walker. He was born in Kristiania, and represented the sports club Sterling. He competed at the 1948 Summer Olympics in London.

References

External links

1919 births
2004 deaths
Athletes from Oslo
Norwegian male racewalkers
Athletes (track and field) at the 1948 Summer Olympics
Olympic athletes of Norway
20th-century Norwegian people